Troitsk is a rural locality (a selo), and one of two settlements in Petropavlovsky National Rural Okrug of Ust-Maysky District in the Sakha Republic, Russia, in addition to Petropavlovsk, the administrative center of the Rural Okrug. Its population as of the 2002 Census was 74.

References

Notes

Sources
Official website of the Sakha Republic. Registry of the Administrative-Territorial Divisions of the Sakha Republic. Ust-Maysky District. 

Rural localities in Ust-Maysky District